Myrcia pseudospectabilis is a species of plant in the family Myrtaceae. It is endemic to coastal rainforest habitats in southern Bahia, Brazil. The tree was first described in 2010, grows to between 1 and 6 metres tall, and produces purple or black fruits between 10 and 12mm in diameter.

References

pseudospectabilis
Crops originating from the Americas
Crops originating from Brazil
Tropical fruit
Endemic flora of Brazil
Fruits originating in South America
Fruit trees
Berries
Plants described in 2010